Bruining is a surname. Notable people with the surname include:

Mack Bruining (born 1997), Dutch basketball player
Nicolette Bruining (1886–1963), Dutch theologian

See also
Bruning (surname)